Dead Silence is the fourth studio album by Canadian rock band Billy Talent. It was released on September 11, 2012 and was produced by the band's guitarist Ian D'Sa.

Billy Talent started recording material for Dead Silence on November 25, 2011 and finished in July 2012.

The title and artwork of the album was revealed on the band's Twitter, Facebook and official website on July 11, 2012. The album's first single, "Viking Death March", was released on May 26, 2012. The second single, "Surprise Surprise", was released on August 7, 2012 and reached number 1 on the Canadian rock/alternative chart. The artwork for the album was created by poster artist Ken Taylor.

Songs featured on the album were nominated at the 2013 Canadian Juno awards, such as "Viking Death March" for single of the year.

The band released the album on their SoundCloud account on September 4, 2012.

Singles and music videos 
 "Viking Death March"
 "Surprise Surprise"
 "Stand Up and Run"
 "Show Me the Way"
 "Runnin' Across the Tracks"
 "Love Was Still Around"

Online videos were released for both "Runnin' Across the Tracks" and "Love Was Still Around".

The teaser video for "Runnin' Across the Tracks" was revealed on October 2, 2013. A few weeks later, the full video was released online October 30, 2013.

A live online video for "Love Was Still Around" was released on May 26, 2015. The video was directed by touring photography and friend, Dustin Rabin.

Track listing

Reception 

Dead Silence has received positive reviews upon release, most critics praising the change of style from its predecessor, Billy Talent III.

Personnel 
 Benjamin Kowalewicz – lead vocals
 Ian D'Sa – lead guitar, backing vocals, producer
 Jonathan Gallant – bass, backing vocals
 Aaron Solowoniuk – drums, percussion
 Ken Taylor – artwork

Charts

Weekly charts

Year-end charts

Certifications

References 

2012 albums
Billy Talent albums
Atlantic Records albums
Roadrunner Records albums
Albums recorded at Armoury Studios
Albums recorded at Noble Street Studios